The Gobosh 800XP is an American light-sport aircraft marketed by Gobosh Aviation of Moline, Illinois. The 800XP was introduced in 2008 and is supplied as a complete ready-to-fly-aircraft.

By 2016 the company website had been taken down and the company had likely gone out of business.

Design and development
It features a cantilever low-wing, a two-seats-in-side-by-side configuration enclosed open cockpit under a forward-hinged bubble canopy, fixed tricycle landing gear and a single engine in tractor configuration.

The aircraft is made from composites. The standard engine available is the  Rotax 912ULS four-stroke powerplant.

Specifications (800XP)

References

External links

Light-sport aircraft
Single-engined tractor aircraft